Antonio "Tony" J. Fas Alzamora (born November 16, 1948 in Cabo Rojo, Puerto Rico) is a Puerto Rican politician and Senator. As of 31 December 2011, he was the longest-serving legislator in the history of Puerto Rico, having served in ten Legislative Assemblies, one House of Representatives (from 1977 to 1980), and nine Senates (since 1980).

Early years and studies 

Antonio Fas Alzamora was born on November 16, 1948, in Cabo Rojo, Puerto Rico to farmer Chaibén J. Fas Fagundo and teacher and housewife Margarita Alzamora Brunet. He finished his elementary and high school at Academia de la Inmaculada Concepción in Mayagüez. He then began his college studies at the University of Puerto Rico at Mayagüez. In 1970, he received his bachelor's degree in natural sciences with a major in Biology. He then studied law at the Pontifical Catholic University of Puerto Rico School of Law receiving his Juris Doctor in December 1972.

In March 1973, Fas Alzamora passed the bar exam and began working as an attorney after establishing his own law firm in Cabo Rojo.

Political career

Representative: 1976–1979 
Fas Alzamora officially began his political career  with the Popular Democratic Party (PPD). In 1976, he was elected to the Puerto Rico House of Representatives for District 20. Two years later, he was also elected as president of the PPD for the District and became a member of the Board.

District Senator: 1980–1995 

After serving in the House of Representatives from 1976 to 1979, representing his native Cabo Rojo, Puerto Rico, Fas Alzamora was elected to the Senate of Puerto Rico in 1980, representing the District of Mayagüez. He was reelected in 1984, 1988 and 1992.

In 1985, he was also appointed as Secretary General of the Popular Democratic Party. He fulfilled those duties, simultaneously with his work as Senator, until 1989. During those terms, he also presided over the Commission of Tourism, Youth, Sports and Recreation. In 1993, he was also appointed as Minority Speaker for his party.

At-large Senator: 1996–2016 

In the year 1996, he was elected as Senator at-large for the first time. He also continued serving as Minority Speaker in the Senate. Fas Alzamora was reelected in 2000, being the senatorial candidate from the PPD with most votes. He was elected unanimously in January, 2001, as the twelfth President of the Senate of Puerto Rico, a post he held until 2004. During this time, he chose Velda González as his President pro tempore. According to Fas Alzamora's biography at the Senate's website, during his presidency, the Senate approved more projects and laws than any other Senate.

He was reelected in 2004 as Senator at-large, but his party's delegation size dropped from 18 to 9, becoming the principal minority party in the Senate. He relinquished the delegation's leadership to Senator José Luis Dalmau, who now serves as Minority Leader after having served as Fas' Majority Leader.

In 2008, Fas Alzamora was elected to his eight term at the Senate and the ninth in the Legislature, tying the record previously set by Rep. Leopoldo Figueroa.

When he was sworn into his 10th consecutive term in the Legislature on January 2, 2013, he became the longest serving legislator in Puerto Rico's history, and was honored as such during the Senate's swearing-in ceremony.

Fas Alzamora retired in 2016, when he opted against running for re-election.

Personal life 

Fas Alzamora is married to Ileana Pacheco Morales, a licensed medical laboratory scientist. They have three children: Ileana Isabel, Antonio Juan, and Marilea. Ileana Fas served as Director of the Management and Budget Office of the Government of Puerto Rico.

See also
University of Puerto Rico at Mayaguez people

|-

References

External links
 on SenadoPR

1948 births
Members of the Senate of Puerto Rico
People from Cabo Rojo, Puerto Rico
Pontifical Catholic University of Puerto Rico alumni
Living people
Presidents of the Senate of Puerto Rico